Mad River Airport  is a private airport located one mile northeast of Tremont City, Ohio, United States. It is owned and operated by the Mad River Airpark. LLC.

Facilities and aircraft 
For the 12-month period ending August 5, 2013, the airport had 15,350 aircraft operations, all are general aviation. There is no control tower in the airport.

References

External links 

Airports in Ohio
Buildings and structures in Clark County, Ohio